The Gymnasium of Dimitrovgrad is a gymnasium secondary school in Dimitrovgrad, Russia. The school has a selective admissions policy. It was founded in 1996 by changing the status of High School Number 13. In January 2005 there were just over 1,000 students in grades 1-11 and 70 teachers. Despite the fabric being poorly maintained, academic standards are high.

References

Dimitrovgrad
1996 establishments in Russia
Educational institutions established in 1996